Prince Pedro of Orleans-Braganza may refer to:

 Prince Pedro de Alcantara of Orléans-Braganza (1875 - 1940), son of Isabel, Princess Imperial of Brazil and Gaston, comte d'Eu 
 Prince Pedro Gastao of Orleans-Braganza (1913 – 2007), one of two claimants to the Brazilian throne as titular Emperor of Brazil
 Prince Pedro Henrique of Orleans-Braganza (1921 - 1981)